94 Ceti b or 94 Ceti Ab to distinguish it from the distant red dwarf companion, is an extrasolar planet orbiting its  star once every 1.2 years.  It was discovered on August 7, 2000 by a team led by Michel Mayor.

It is most stable if its inclination is about 65 or 115, yielding a mass of about 1.85 that of Jupiter.

See also
 Iota Horologii b
 79 Ceti b
 94 Ceti

References

External links

Cetus (constellation)
Exoplanets discovered in 2000
Exoplanets detected by radial velocity